"Forgive Me This" is a rare single released only in Australia by Greek pop singer Anna Vissi on 8 August 1997.  The single featured "Forgive Me This" which later appeared on her international album Everything I Am, as well as the rare track "Crush" released only on this single. The single also featured two Greek hits, "Mavra Gialia" and "Eleni", from her Greek studio albums Travma and Re! respectively.

Music video
The music video of "Forgive Me This" features Vissi and a man playing in a field of flowers. In some scenes, Vissi is alone or lying down on a flower bed.

Track listing
"Forgive Me This"
"Crush"
"Mavra Gialia" (Black sunglasses)
"Eleni" (Helen)

Charts

References

External links
 

Anna Vissi songs
Songs written by Nikos Karvelas
English-language Greek songs